Black Pond is a 2011 British film.

Black Pond may also refer to:

 Black Pond (New York), a lake near Corinth, New York
 Black Pond Township, Oregon County, Missouri
 Black Pond Wildlife Management Area, on Lake Ontario, New York